The first season of Dynasty, an American television series based on the 1980s prime time soap opera of the same name, originally aired in the United States on The CW from October 11, 2017 through May 11, 2018. The season was produced by CBS Television Studios, with Sallie Patrick as showrunner and executive producer alongside executive producers Josh Schwartz and Stephanie Savage. The pilot, which was announced in September 2016, was ordered to series in May 2017. On November 8, 2017, The CW picked up Dynasty for a full season of 22 episodes. On April 2, 2018, The CW renewed the series for a second season.

Season one stars Elizabeth Gillies as heiress Fallon Carrington, Grant Show as her billionaire father Blake Carrington, Nathalie Kelley as Blake's new wife Cristal, and James Mackay as Fallon's brother Steven, with Robert Christopher Riley as Michael Culhane, Sam Adegoke as Jeff Colby, Rafael de la Fuente as Sam Jones, and Alan Dale as Joseph Anders. Notable recurring characters introduced in season one include Claudia Blaisdel (Brianna Brown); Monica (Wakeema Hollis); Cesil Colby (Hakeem Kae-Kazim); Liam Ridley (Adam Huber); Iris Machado (Elena Tovar); Alejandro Raya (Luis Fernández); Ted Dinard (Michael Patrick Lane); Melissa Daniels (Kelly Rutherford); Hank Sullivan (Brent Antonello); and Alexis Carrington (Nicollette Sheridan).

Plot
Dynasty begins with heiress Fallon Carrington unhappy to find her billionaire father Blake engaged to Cristal, a rival employee at the family company. When Fallon's machinations to separate the couple backfire and cost her a promotion, she allies with Blake's nemesis and former employee, Jeff Colby, and strikes out on her own. Meanwhile, the arrival of Cristal's opportunistic nephew Sam—who becomes romantically involved with Fallon's wayward brother Steven—threatens to expose her shady past. The Carringtons form a united front in the wake of the suspicious death of Cristal's former lover Matthew, but things at the mansion do not remain harmonious for long. Blake's manipulations put him at odds with Cristal and his children, while the rivalry between Fallon and Cristal cools. Tired of waiting around for Fallon to take him seriously, Michael begins to date someone else, which only intensifies Fallon's feelings for him but drives her into Jeff's arms. Matthew's pregnant widow Claudia convalesces at the mansion with a hidden agenda, and Cristal's past comes back to haunt her in the form of her sister Iris, and Sam's father, Alejandro. Steven and Sam's on-again, off-again relationship is complicated by Sam's criminal tendencies and Steven's unstable ex-boyfriend, Ted. Jeff's partnership with Fallon is revealed to be a means for him to destroy the Carringtons for what Blake did to Jeff's father, Cesil. Fallon enlists Michael and Cristal to help her turn the tables on the Colbys, and she manages to neutralize Jeff and secure a percentage of his company. Blake's ex-wife Alexis—Steven and Fallon's mother—returns, purportedly to reconnect with her children but in fact angling for a piece of the Carrington fortune. Alexis arranges for her lover to pose as her and Blake's kidnapped son Adam, and reveals to Jeff and Monica that their mother is Blake's half-sister. Fallon ousts Blake as CEO of Carrington Atlantic just as the Colbys force a sale of the company. At Steven and Sam's wedding, an unhinged Claudia appears and shoots Cristal. Blake, Fallon, and Sam escape a fire in the stable house, but Steven, Michael, Alexis, and Cristal remain trapped inside.

The reboot updates several elements from the 1980s original, including moving the setting from Denver, Colorado to Atlanta, Georgia; making Steven's homosexuality a nonissue to Blake; and changing gold digger Sammy Jo from a woman to a gay man. Additionally, in the new series, both Blake's new wife and her nephew are Hispanic, and both chauffeur Michael Culhane and the Colby family are African-American.

Cast and characters

Main
 Elizabeth Gillies as Fallon Carrington, an Atlanta energy executive and heiress who is the daughter of billionaire Blake Carrington and his first wife, Alexis
 Skylar Morgan Jones  and Marisa Hampton  portray younger versions of Fallon
 Nathalie Kelley as Cristal Flores Carrington ( Celia Machado), Fallon's new stepmother, a woman with a shady past
 James Mackay as Steven Carrington, Fallon's gay environmentalist brother
 Paul Luke Bonenfant  and Nicholas Cordts  portray younger versions of Steven
 Robert Christopher Riley as Michael Culhane, the Carrington chauffeur and Fallon's lover
 Sam Adegoke as Jeff Colby, business rival to Blake, a young tech genius
 Rafael de la Fuente as Samuel Josiah "Sammy Jo" Jones, Cristal's wayward nephew and Steven's fiancé
 Alan Dale as Joseph Anders, the Carrington majordomo
 Grant Show as Blake Carrington, billionaire CEO of Carrington Atlantic, married to Cristal, and the father of Steven and Fallon by his first wife

Recurring

 Brianna Brown as Claudia Blaisdel, Matthew's wife, a former engineer 
 Wakeema Hollis as Monica Colby, Jeff's sister 
 Elena Tovar as Iris Machado, Cristal's sister and Sam's mother 
 Luis Fernández as Alejandro Raya, Sam's father who is operating under the alias of Diego Calastana 
 Michael Patrick Lane as Ted Dinard, Steven's ex-boyfriend 
 Hakeem Kae-Kazim as Cesil Colby, Jeff and Monica's incarcerated father 
 Adam Huber as Liam Ridley, a writer who marries Fallon (real name: Jack Lowden) 
 Nicollette Sheridan as Alexis Carrington, Blake's ex-wife, the estranged mother of Steven and Fallon 
 Nick Wechsler as Matthew Blaisdel, Cristal's former lover, a field engineer who dies in a suspicious explosion

Guests
 Dave Maldonado as Willy Santiago, Matthew's friend and coworker at Carrington Atlantic 
 Michael Beach as Police Chief Aaron Stansfield, a longtime friend of Blake's 
 KJ Smith as Kori Rucks, Michael's ex-girlfriend 
 Mustafa Elzein as Ramy Crockett, Sam's friend who burglarizes the Manor at his request
 Nana Visitor as Diana Davis, editor-in-chief of Atlanta Digest
 Arnetia Walker as Louella Culhane, Michael's mother 
 Darryl Booker as James Culhane, Michael's father 
 Hines Ward and Jamal Anderson as themselves
 Andi Matheny and later Natalie Karp as Mrs. Gunnerson, the Carrington cook
 Bill Smitrovich as Thomas Carrington, Blake's father 
 Kearran Giovanni as Police Chief Bobbi Johnson
 Kelly Rutherford as Melissa Daniels, wife of Senator Paul Daniels, and Steven's former lover 
 J. R. Cacia as Rick Morales, a journalist and old friend of Cristal's 
 Rick Hearst as  Senator Paul Daniels, a longtime contact of Blake's
 Steven Culp as Tim Meyers, a business associate of Jeff and Fallon
 Stephan Jones as Gerard Dinard, Ted's father
 Elizabeth Youman as Evie Culhane, Michael's sister
 Brent Antonello as Hank Sullivan, Alexis's lover who is impersonating her and Blake's kidnapped firstborn, Adam 
 L. Scott Caldwell as Lo Cox, Jeff and Monica's maternal grandmother, Thomas Carrington's former secretary

Episodes

Production

Development
In September 2016, it was announced that a reboot of the 1980s prime time soap opera Dynasty was in development at The CW, co-written by Josh Schwartz, Stephanie Savage, and Sallie Patrick. The show received a 13-episode a first season order on May 10, 2017. A preview trailer was released on May 18, 2017. On November 8, 2017, the series received a back nine order for a full season of 22 episodes.

Casting
Nathalie Kelley was cast as Cristal in January 2017, followed by Elizabeth Gillies as Fallon, Sam Adegoke as playboy Jeff Colby, and Robert Christopher Riley as Blake's chauffeur Michael Culhane in February. Next cast were Grant Show as Fallon's father Blake Carrington, and Rafael de la Fuente as Sam Jones, a gay male version of the original series' Sammy Jo Carrington, in March. The remaining main cast members are James Mackay as Fallon's gay brother Steven, and Alan Dale as Carrington majordomo Anders, Additional recurring performers include Nick Wechsler as Cristal's ex-lover Matthew Blaisdel, Brianna Brown as Matthew's wife Claudia, and Wakeema Hollis as Jeff's sister Monica Colby. In November 2017, Nicollette Sheridan was cast in the role of Blake's ex-wife Alexis Carrington. Other guest stars include Elena Tovar as Iris Machado, Cristal's sister and Sam's mother, Bill Smitrovich as Thomas Carrington, Blake's estranged father, and Hakeem Kae-Kazim as Cesil Colby, Jeff and Monica's father.

In June 2018, Kelley told E! News that she would not be returning for season two. She said in 2020 that she had been surprised to get the call that she would not be returning to the series, and explained:

The CW announced in August 2018 that Ana Brenda Contreras had been cast as "the real Cristal Flores" for the second season.

Filming
Filming for the season commenced on July 19, 2017, in Atlanta, Georgia, and wrapped up during the first quarter of 2018.

Music
Paul Leonard-Morgan composed the music for the first season, with him, Bill Conti and Troy Nõka composing the music for the theme song, which debuted in the third episode, "Guilt is for Insecure People", but is only used in some episodes. Composer Paul Leonard-Morgan worked with Troy Nõka to get "an '80s-rock vibe" for the song, to match Leonard-Morgan's soundtrack for the series. The new theme was recorded with an orchestra at Capitol Records in Hollywood, featuring Los Angeles Philharmonic lead trumpet player Tom Hooten.

Broadcast
Season one of Dynasty premiered on The CW in the United States on Wednesday, October 11, 2017, with the season two premiere of Riverdale as its lead-in. Netflix acquired the exclusive international broadcast rights to Dynasty, making it available as a Netflix original series on the platform less than a day after their original U.S. broadcast. The series moved to Fridays starting with the fourteenth episode, and the season finale aired on May 11, 2018. Season one of Dynasty is available worldwide on Netflix.

Leslie Moonves, the then-head of CBS Corporation, said in 2017, "We own 100 percent of [Dynasty], and we've already licensed it to Netflix in 188 countries ... So this means Dynasty is profitable before it even hits the air."

Reception

Ratings

Critical response
The review aggregator website Rotten Tomatoes reported a 49% approval rating with an average rating of 6.54/10 based on 47 reviews. The website's consensus reads, "Dynasty revival retains enough of its predecessor's over-the-top allure to offer a glamorous guilty pleasure in its first season, even if it never quite recaptures the magic of the original." Metacritic, which uses a weighted average, gave the season a score of 52, based on 17 critics, indicating "mixed or average reviews".

Reviewing the first episode of the season, Danette Chavez writing for The A.V. Club felt that despite the premiere "cresting waves of '80s nostalgia and reboots, the CW's reimagined Dynasty feels like it's coming at a bit of an inopportune time".

Accolades
In 2018, the series was nominated by the Dorian Awards as Campy TV Show of the Year.

References

External links
 
 

2017 American television seasons
2018 American television seasons
Dynasty (2017 TV series) seasons